Bela nuperrima is a species of sea snail, a marine gastropod mollusk in the family Mangeliidae.

Description
The length of the shell varies between 5 mm and 14 mm.

The rather thin shell shows about twelve distant, small longitudinal riblets, crossed by distant raised lines.

Distribution
This marine species occurs in the Mediterranean Sea and in the Atlantic Ocean off Senegal

Fossils of this marine species were found in Pleistocene strata in Italy.

References

 Philippi,  Moll. Sicil., ii, 174, t. 26, f. 23, 1844
  Della Bella G., Naldi F. & Scarponi D. (2015). Molluschi marini del Plio-Pleistocene dell'Emilia-Romagna e della Toscana - Superfamiglia Conoidea, vol. 4, Mangeliidae II. Lavori della Società Italiana di Malacologia. 26: 1-80

External links
  Tucker, J.K. 2004 Catalog of recent and fossil turrids (Mollusca: Gastropoda). Zootaxa 682:1-1295.
 

 MNHN, Paris: holotype

nuperrima